The 1985 Soviet Cup Final was a football match that took place at the Lenin's Central Stadium, Moscow on June 23, 1985. The match was the 44th Soviet Cup Final and it was contested by FC Dynamo Kyiv and FC Shakhtar Donetsk. The Soviet Cup winner Dinamo won the cup for the seventh time. The last year defending holders Dinamo Moscow were eliminated in the round of 16 of the competition by Dinamo Kiev on penalties.

It was fourth and the last all-Ukrainian Soviet Cup final.

Road to Moscow 
All sixteen Soviet Top League clubs did not have to go through qualification to get into the competition, so Dinamo and Shakhter both qualified for the competition automatically.

Note: In all results below, the score of the finalist is given first (H: home; A: away).

Previous Encounters

Match details

MATCH OFFICIALS 
Assistant referees:
 Yu.Savchenko (Moscow)
 A.Mushkovets (Moscow)
Fourth official: 

MATCH RULES
90 minutes.
30 minutes of extra-time if necessary.
Penalty shoot-out if scores still level.
Seven named substitutes
Maximum of 3 substitutions.

See also
 1985 Soviet Top League
 1985 Soviet First League
 1985 Soviet Second League

References

External links 
The competition calendar

1985
Cup
Soviet Cup Final 1985
Soviet Cup Final 1985
June 1985 sports events in Europe
1985 in Moscow